Johnny Mak Ip-sing (born 1960) is a pro-ROC and pro-democracy politician in Hong Kong. He has been a Yuen Long District Councillor since 1991 and is the current Chairman of the  Democratic Alliance.

Biography
Growing up in a pro-ROC background, Mak was a graduate from the Tamkang University in Taiwan, studying Japanese language. He was the president of the Hong Kong Federation of Taiwan Universities Alumni Association from 2007 to 2011. He joined the democracy movement during the Tiananmen Square protests of 1989. He was member of the first major pro-democracy party United Democrats of Hong Kong which later transformed into the Democratic Party. In the 1991 District Board elections, he became member of the Yuen Long District Council through Yuen Long Town South and was re-elected through Fung Cheung in 1994. He has since been holding this seat.

Mak was also a member of the pro-ROC 123 Democratic Alliance which was dissolved in 2000 before he joined the radical democratic party The Frontier. He contested in the 1995 Regional Council election and 1998 Legislative Council election with Yum Sin-ling for the 123 Democratic Alliance but was not elected. After the 2003 July 1 protests, he set up the local electoral alliance Yuen Long Tin Shui Wai Democratic Alliance with Albert Chan Wai-yip for the 2003 District Council election. He became member of the Executive Committee of the League of Social Democrats (LSD). During the intra-party factional struggle, he sided with former Chairman Wong Yuk-man and issued a public letter to criticise the incumbent Chairman Andrew To Kwan-hang. He later quit the party with Wong and became Vice-Chairman of the new party, People Power which set up by Wong.

In 2011 District Council election, he became the only People Power candidate who won a seat in the election. In 2012, he disputed with the party over the candidacy in the 2012 Legislative Council election. He quit the party on 28 June 2012 and ran under the banner of the Democratic Alliance, but failed to be elected with 2,896 votes.

On the issue of the Occupy Central movement campaigned by the pan-democrats with the aims at pressing the Beijing government to implement genuine universal suffrage, Mak was accused by pro-Beijing newspaper Tai Kung Pao of working for the Military Intelligence Bureau of the ROC National Security Bureau. Mak dismissed the accusation, saying it was a joke.

Positions 
In addition to being Chairman of the Democratic Alliance and Vice-chairman of the Yuen Long District Council, Mak serves other positions.

Mak currently serves as primary organizer of yearly Double Tenth celebrations in Hong Kong at Hung Lau. He is chairman of the Highwise Yuen Long Service Centre, the group which manages the memorial garden.

Also, he is Honorary President of the Hong Kong Federation of Taiwan Universities Alumni Association, and is Vice President of the Tamkang University Alumni Association.

References

1960 births
Living people
District councillors of Yuen Long District
United Democrats of Hong Kong politicians
Democratic Party (Hong Kong) politicians
123 Democratic Alliance politicians
The Frontier (Hong Kong) politicians
League of Social Democrats politicians
People Power (Hong Kong) politicians
Members of the Election Committee of Hong Kong, 2007–2012